Luis Nunes Vicente (born 1967) is an applied mathematician and optimizer who is known for his research work in Continuous Optimization and particularly in Derivative-Free Optimization. He is the Timothy J. Wilmott '80 Endowed Chair Professor and Department Chair of the Department of Industrial and Systems Engineering of Lehigh University.

Education 
Luis Nunes Vicente was born in Coimbra, Portugal in 1967. He obtained a B.S. in Mathematics and Operations Research at the University of Coimbra in 1990. He continued his studies at Rice University, USA, earning a Ph.D. in Applied Mathematics in 1996. His Ph.D. dissertation, titled Trust-Region Interior-Point Algorithms for a Class of Nonlinear Programming Problems, was supervised by John Dennis.

Career 
From 1996 to 2018, Luis Nunes Vicente was a faculty member at the Department of Mathematics of the University of Coimbra, Portugal, becoming full professor in 2009. He held several visiting positions, namely at the IBM T.J. Watson Research Center and the University of Minnesota in 2002–2003, at the Courant Institute of Mathematical Sciences, New York University and the Université Paul Verlaine of Metz in 2009–2010, and at Roma/Sapienza and Rice University in 2016–2017. He was visiting Chercheur Sénior of the Fondation de Coopération Sciences et Technologies pour l'Aéronautique et l'Espace at CERFACS and IPN Toulouse, during 2010–2015.

He has served on numerous editorial boards, including SIAM Journal on Optimization (2009–2017), EURO Journal on Computational Optimization, and Optimization Methods and Software (2010–2018). He was Editor-in-Chief of Portugaliae Mathematica during 2013–2018.

Book 
Luis Nunes Vicente co-authored the book Introduction to Derivative-Free Optimization, MPS-SIAM Series on Optimization, SIAM, Philadelphia, 2009, with Katya Scheinberg and Andrew R. Conn.

Recognition 
Luis Nunes Vicente was awarded the Lagrange Prize of SIAM (Society for Industrial and Applied Mathematics) and MOS (Mathematical Optimization Society) for the co-authorship of the book Introduction to Derivative-Free Optimization.

With his Ph.D. dissertation, he received the Ralph Budd Thesis Award from Rice University in 1996 and was one of the three finalists of the 94-96 A. W. Tucker Prize of MOS. He is also the winner of the Lagrange Award.

References

External links 
 Personal web page at Lehigh University
 Personal web page at the University of Coimbra
 Publications form Google Scholar
 Luis Nunes Vicente at the Mathematics Genealogy Project

1967 births
Living people
People from Coimbra
21st-century Portuguese mathematicians
American mathematicians
Rice University alumni
20th-century Portuguese mathematicians